The Flinder's Ranges rock-skink or Centralian Ranges rock-skink (Liopholis margaretae) is a species of skink, a lizard in the family Scincidae. The species is endemic to central Australia.

References

Skinks of Australia
Liopholis
Reptiles described in 1968
Taxa named by Glen Milton Storr